Halo in a Haystack is the debut album by American metalcore band Converge, released in 1994 through Earthmaker Records.

Overview 
To fund the making of the record, vocalist Jacob Bannon saved up money from working at a nursing home. The record was released as a black vinyl and is not available in any other format. Only 1000 copies of this record were made and the record has not been reprinted since. However all of the record's tracks with the exception of the 9th track "Exhale" can be found on later Converge releases such as 1995's Caring and Killing and 2002's Unloved & Weeded Out.

Track listing 
All tracks written by Converge.

Personnel

Converge
 Jacob Bannon – vocals
 Kurt Ballou – guitar
 Aaron Dalbec – guitar
 Jeff Feinburg – bass guitar
 Damon Bellorado – drums

Session musicians
 Erik Ralston – bass guitar (tracks 8, 9)

Artwork and design
 John Murray – cover
 Tre McCarthy – photography

References

Converge (band) albums
1994 albums